SU, Su or su may refer to:

Arts and entertainment
 Su (Shugo Chara!), a fictional character in the manga series Shugo Chara!
 Sinclair User, a magazine
 Steven Universe, an American animated television series on Cartoon Network
 StumbleUpon, a web discovery service

Businesses and organizations

 Aeroflot, a Russian airline (IATA code)
 Scripture Union, a Christian organisation
 Socialist Youth (Norway), a Norwegian youth league
 Sukhoi, a Russian aircraft company

Geography
 Su, Catalonia, a village in Spain
 Su, Iran, a village in Kurdistan Province, Iran
 Jiangsu (abbr. Sū, 苏), province of the People's Republic of China
 Suzhou (abbr. Sū, 苏), city in Jiangsu province
 Soviet Union (former ISO country code)
 Subotica, a city in Serbia (license plate code SU)

Language
 Su (kana)
 Sú (cuneiform), a sign in cuneiform writing
 Sundanese Language, ISO 639-1 code: su

Science, technology, and mathematics

Computing
 .su, country code top-level domain for the Soviet Union
 su (Unix), the substitute user command
 Seismic Unix, a collection of seismic data processing tools
 Subscriber unit, any radio device used to connect to a high-speed network access point
 Superuser, a privileged computer user account

Mathematics
 Special unitary group, a term used in algebra, SU(n)

Vehicles
 Vought SU, a US Navy Scout aircraft
 SU carburetors (for Skinners Union), a brand of carburettor
 Samokhodnaya Ustanovka, Russian term for a self-propelled gun

Universities

In China
 Shandong University in Jinan, Shandong, China
 Shanxi University in Taiyuan, Shanxi, China
 Shanghai University in Shanghai, China
 Sichuan University in Chengdu, Sichuan, China
 Soochow University (Suzhou) in Suzhou, Jiangsu, China

In the United States
 Salisbury University in Salisbury, Maryland, United States
 Samford University in Birmingham, Alabama, United States
 Seattle University in Seattle, Washington, United States
 Seton Hall University in South Orange, New Jersey, United States
 Shenandoah University in Winchester, Virginia, United States
 Shippensburg University of Pennsylvania in Shippensburg, Pennsylvania, United States
 Singularity University in California, United States
 South University in Savannah, Georgia, United States
 Southern University in Baton Rouge, Louisiana, United States
 Southwestern University in Georgetown, Texas, United States
 Stanford University in Stanford, California, United States
 Stevenson University in Stevenson and Owings Mills, Maryland, United States
 Syracuse University in Syracuse, New York, United States

In other countries
 Sabancı University in Istanbul, Turkey
 Sargodha University in Sargodha, Pakistan
 Sharda University in Greater Noida, Uttar Pradesh, India
 Sheffield University in Sheffield, South Yorkshire, United Kingdom
 Shiraz University in Shiraz, Iran
 Silliman University in Dumaguete City, Negros Oriental, Philippines
 Silpakorn University in Bangkok, Thailand
 Sindh University in Jamshoro, Pakistan
 Sofia University in Sofia, Bulgaria
 Sogang University in Seoul, South Korea
 Sophia University in Tokyo, Japan 
 Staffordshire University in Staffordshire, United Kingdom
 Stellenbosch University in Stellenbosch, South Africa
 Stockholm University in Stockholm, Sweden
 Superior University in Lahore, Pakistan
 Surya University in Tangerang, Indonesia

Other uses
 Su (surname), 蘇 or 苏, a Chinese surname
 Statens Uddanneslsesstøtte, a government grant for students in Denmark
 Egypt (aircraft registration prefix SU)

See also
 Sioux, a Native American and First Nations people in North America
 Sioux (disambiguation)
 Sue (disambiguation)
 Sault (disambiguation)
 Soo (disambiguation)
 US (disambiguation)